Love Battery was an American rock band from Seattle, Washington. They released five albums during the 1990s, followed by sporadic one-off reunions. Frontman Ron Nine and guitarist Kevin Whitworth has been the only consistent members of the band throughout their existence.

History
Love Battery was formed in 1989 by former rock band Room Nine leader Ron Nine (born as Ron Rudzitis), guitarist Kevin Whitworth (ex-Crisis Party), bassist Tommy "Bonehead" Simpson (also ex-Crisis Party), and Mudhoney drummer Dan Peters.  Their name came from a song of the same name by British punk band the Buzzcocks.

Before releasing their first single Peters left the group and was replaced by grunge band ex-Skin Yard drummer Jason Finn. With this lineup the band released their debut single "Between the Eyes" for seminal Seattle record label Sub Pop. The band released their debut EP/mini-album Between the Eyes in 1990 on Tupelo Recordings. By the middle of 1990 Simpson had been replaced by ex-U-Men bassist Jim Tillman. Between the Eyes was then expanded and released as their first official full-length album in 1991 via Sub Pop (which included three additional tracks with Tillman on bass).

Following Between the Eyes were the "Foot" and "Out of Focus" singles. Both singles later appeared on 1992's Dayglo album. In the Sub Pop catalog, Dayglo was listed as "Blotter not included" (a play on "Batteries not included" instead referring to LSD). Soon after, Tillman left to pursue other interests. He was replaced at first by original bassist Simpson, who in turn was replaced by ex-Green River and Mother Love Bone guitarist-turned-bassist Bruce Fairweather.

In 1993 the Far Gone album appeared, which to many was considered a disappointment following Dayglo'''s critical success. Initially Far Gone was to be released by PolyGram Records but due to contractual problems with Sub Pop, Far Gone was dumped by the major label. Instead an inferior "rough mix" of the album was released by Sub Pop, a problem which Love Battery planned to rectify by remixing and reissuing but never did.

Following the Far Gone fiasco, Love Battery signed with Atlas Records in 1994 releasing the "Nehru Jacket" single late in the year. It contained two songs that also found their way onto the band's Straight Freak Ticket 1995 album, which was also released on Atlas; however, the label failed to promote the band and album properly which resulted in poor sales. Videos were made for the songs "Fuzz Factory" and "Harold's Pink Room". In 1996 Love Battery was featured in the documentary Hype!, chronicling the rise of the Seattle grunge music scene. A clip was shown of a live performance of "Between the Eyes". Shortly thereafter Finn left the group to focus on The Presidents of the United States of America, a band that attained mainstream success by 1996.

A prolonged period of uncertainty ensued following Finn's departure. Initially, Finn's technician from The Presidents of the United States of America, ex-Posies and Fastbacks drummer Mike Musburger, had joined on drums. He was then replaced by original drummer Peters by 1997. The band returned to an independent label (C/Z Records) and released their fifth album Confusion Au Go Go in 1998. Contributions from drummers Finn and Musburger appeared on a few songs, but Peters had ultimately done the majority of the drumming on the album.

Following the release of Confusion Au Go Go, Love Battery remained for the most part quiet. A few one-off performances were made between 1999 to 2002 which featured the return of Simpson on bass and Finn on drums. After a prolonged period of inactivity the band played their first show in four years on June 23, 2006, at Neumo's in Seattle, WA. The then-current lineup consisted of Nine, Whitworth, Simpson, and Musburger.

Love Battery reunited amidst the individual members' other projects to perform at The Mix in Seattle, Washington on October 22, 2011. Nine and Whitworth had enlisted bassist Chris Eckman and drummer Ben Ireland to complete the lineup. In 2012, they performed in venues such as LoFi Performance Gallery on May 19, the Mural Amphitheatre on August 20, and the Comet Tavern on September 29 alongside artists such as Atomic Bride, Summer Babes, and Blood Orange Paradise. On their Myspace page, they announced plans to release new material in the following year, which ultimately never came to fruition. Nine and Whitworth instead teamed up with Tad bassist Kurt Danielson in a band called Vaporland. They released their self-titled debut album in 2014.

The Dayglo lineup of Love Battery (Nine, Whitworth, Tillman, and Finn) reunited in 2018 to play the Dayglo album in its entirety at several Seattle shows. In late 2022, a Love Battery album got remastered for the first time as Jackpot Records handled the Dayglo reissue on vinyl. The Dayglo lineup also reunited for a one-off performance in October of that same year as well.

Band members
Final members
 Ron Nine – vocals, guitars (1989–2002, 2006, 2011–2012, 2018, 2022)
 Kevin Whitworth – guitars (1989–2002, 2006, 2011–2012, 2018, 2022)
 Jason Finn – drums (1989–1996, 2000–2002, 2018, 2022)
 Jim Tillman – bass (1990–1992, 2018, 2022)

Former members
 Dan Peters – drums (1989, 1997–2000)
 Tommy Simpson – bass (1989–1990, 1992, 1999–2002, 2006)
 Bruce Fairweather – bass (1992–1999)
 Mike Musburger – drums (1996–1997, 2006)
 Ben Ireland – drums (2011–2012)
 Chris Eckman – bass (2011–2012)

Timeline
Color denotes main live duty.

Discography
AlbumsBetween the Eyes (Tupelo Recordings, 1990)Dayglo (Sub Pop Records, 1992)Far Gone (Sub Pop Records, 1993)Straight Freak Ticket (Atlas Records, 1995)Confusion Au Go Go (C/Z Records, 1998)

Singles
"Between the Eyes" (Sub Pop Records, 1989)
"Foot" (Sub Pop Records, 1991)
"Out of Focus" (Sub Pop Records, 1991)
"Half Past You" (Sub Pop Records, 1993)
"Nehru Jacket" (Atlas Records, 1994)
"Fuzz Factory" (Atlas Records, 1995)
"Harold's Pink Room" (Atlas Records, 1995)
"Snipe Hunt" (Let Down Records, 1998)

Compilation/Soundtrack contributions
"Between the Eyes" on The Grunge Years (Sub Pop Records, 1991)
"I Just Can't Be Happy Today" on Another Damned Seattle Compilation (Dashboard Hula Girl Records, 1991)
"Ball and Chain" on Milk For Pussy (Mad Queen Records, 1994)
"No Matter What You Do" on We're All Normal And We Want Our Freedom: A Tribute To Arthur Lee and Love (Alias Records, 1994)
"White Bird" on Star Power! (Pravda Records, 1995)
"Fuzz Factory" on Turn It Up & Pass It On, Volume 1 (1995)
"Straight Freak Show" on huH Magazine CD6 (promo only) (RayGun Press, 1995)
"Out of Focus (Live)" on Bite Back: Live At The Crocodile Cafe (PopLlama Records, 1996)
"Color Blind" on Home Alive: The Art of Self-Defense (Epic Records, 1996)
"Commercial Suicide" on Teriyaki Asthma, Vols. 6–10 (C/Z Records, 1999)
"Between the Eyes" on The Birth of Alternative Vol. 2 (Flashback Records, 2003)
"Half Past You" on Sleepless In Seattle: The Birth Of Grunge (LiveWire Recordings, 2006)
"Out of Focus" on Teen Spirit: MOJO Presents 15 Noise-Filled Classics from the American Underground Scene 1989–1992 (MOJO Records, 2017)''

References

External links

Official MySpace.com page
Official website
[ Love Battery at AllMusic.com]
 

Musical groups established in 1989
Musical groups disestablished in 2002
Musical groups reestablished in 2006
Musical groups disestablished in 2006
Musical groups reestablished in 2011
Grunge musical groups
C/Z Records artists
Sub Pop artists
Musical groups from Seattle